Sonny Pittaro Field is a baseball venue located in Lawrenceville, New Jersey, United States.  It is home to the Rider University Broncs college baseball team of the Division I Metro Atlantic Athletic Conference.  The facility has a capacity of 2,000 spectators.

The field is named for former Rider baseball coach Sonny Pittaro.  Pittaro coached the Broncs for 34 years, winning 9 conference titles and appearing in the NCAA tournament 8 times.

Pittaro Field features stadium seating, a press box, and an irrigation system.

See also 
 List of NCAA Division I baseball venues

References 

College baseball venues in the United States
Baseball venues in New Jersey
Rider Broncs baseball
Lawrence Township, Mercer County, New Jersey